Jim Schlossnagle (born August 12, 1970) is an American baseball coach and former pitcher, who is the current head baseball coach of the Texas A&M Aggies. He played college baseball at Elon from 1986 to 1989 for head coach Rick Jones. He then served as the head coach of the UNLV Rebels (2002–2003) and the TCU Horned Frogs (2004–2021).

Schlossnagle has been named a National Coach of the Year by the National Collegiate Baseball Writers Association in 2010 and by Baseball America in 2016, and he has won 8 conference Coach of the Year awards in his 16-year head coaching career.

Early life and career
Schlossnagle grew up in Smithsburg, Maryland, and attended Smithsburg schools.  Schlossnagle graduated magna cum laude from Elon University, where he pitched for the Fightin' Christians' 1989 NAIA World Series team and also began his coaching career in 1990 as a pitching coach.  After three seasons on the staff at Elon, Schlossnagle spent 1993 on the staff at Clemson before accepting the Associate Head Coach position at Tulane in 1994.  He spent eight years at Tulane, including a trip to the College World Series in 2001.

UNLV
In 2002, Schlossnagle was hired as the head coach at UNLV.  A year later, he led the Rebels to a 47–17 record, which included winning both the regular season title and conference tournament in the Mountain West Conference, as well as the Rebel's first NCAA Tournament bid since 1996.

TCU
On August 9, 2003, Schlossnagle was named the head coach at TCU, whose baseball program had just completed its first year in the brand-new Lupton Stadium.  During his first season in Fort Worth, 2004, he led the Horned Frogs to a then-school record 39 wins and a Conference USA Tournament Championship, clinching their first NCAA bid since 1994.  In 2005 and 2006, the Horned Frogs won their second and third consecutive conference tournament championships (2006 was in the Mountain West), which went along with two more NCAA Regional appearances.  Only to finish behind Jack Connell in all-time wins.  

In his first three years at TCU, Schlossnagle coached four players who appeared on All-America teams: Robbie Findlay (Honorable Mention in 2004), Lance Broadway (1st Team in 2005), Jake Arrieta (2nd Team in 2006) and Chad Huffman (3rd Team in 2006).

Schlossnagle became the winningest coach in TCU baseball history on February 21, 2016, with his 518th win.  He is the only coach to lead TCU to the College World Series, having led them to Omaha five times (2010, 2014, 2015, 2016, 2017).  During his tenure in Fort Worth, Schlossnagle has won three National Coach of the Year Awards, two in 2010 and one in 2016.

Texas A&M
On June 9, 2021, Schlossnagle was named the head baseball coach of the Texas A&M Aggies. In his first season, he led the Aggies to the SEC West division championship and the College World Series.

Head coaching record
Below is a table of Schlossnagle's yearly records as a collegiate head baseball coach.

See also
 List of current NCAA Division I baseball coaches

References

External links
 TCU profile

1970 births
Living people
Clemson Tigers baseball coaches
Elon Phoenix baseball coaches
Elon Phoenix baseball players
Sportspeople from Hagerstown, Maryland
Texas A&M Aggies baseball coaches
TCU Horned Frogs baseball coaches
Tulane Green Wave baseball coaches
UNLV Rebels baseball coaches